Baraga Airport  is a privately owned public use airport located four miles west of the central business district of Baraga, a city in Baraga County, Michigan, United States.

Facilities and aircraft 
For the 12-month period ending September 23, 2010, the airport had 46 aircraft operations: 100% general aviation. At that time there were no aircraft based at the airport.

References

External links 

Defunct airports in Michigan
Airports in Michigan
Buildings and structures in Baraga County, Michigan
Transportation in Baraga County, Michigan
Airports in the Upper Peninsula of Michigan